Viscount of Salinas is a hereditary title in the Peerage of Spain, granted in 1688 by Charles II to Francisco de Carvajal, 7th Lord of Salinas de los Mazones, 9th Lord of Sobrinos in Talavera de la Reina and knight of the Order of Alcántara.

Viscounts of Salinas

Francisco de Carvajal y Loaysa, 1st Viscount of Salinas
Gutierre de Meneses y Carvajal, 2nd Viscount of Salinas
?
Pedro de Monroy y Meneses, 4th Viscount of Salinas
Antonio Javier Rodríguez de Monroy y Meneses, 5th Viscount of Salinas
Francisca María Rodríguez de Monroy y Meneses, 6th Viscountess of Salinas
Petra Rodríguez de Monroy y Meneses, 7th Viscountess of Salinas
José María Unceta y Berriozábal, 8th Viscount of Salinas
María del Pilar Unceta y Urigoitia, 9th Viscount of Salinas
Santiago Satrústegui y Unceta, 10th Viscount of Salinas

See also
Spanish nobility

References

Viscounts of Spain
Lists of Spanish nobility
Noble titles created in 1688